Brian Grove (23 February 1921 – 1 May 2009) was an Australian cricketer. He played in three first-class matches for South Australia in 1952/53.

See also
 List of South Australian representative cricketers

References

External links
 

1921 births
2009 deaths
Australian cricketers
South Australia cricketers
Cricketers from Adelaide